Ajemian (in classical orthography: Աճէմեան) is an Armenian surname.

People
Notable people with the surname include:

Ajemian
Anahid Ajemian (born 1924), American violinist
Chris Ajemian (born 1986), American lacrosse player
Jerard Ajemian, Lebanese Armenian footballer
Kevork Ajemian (1932–1998), French writer, journalist and activist
Maro Ajemian (1921–1978), American classical pianist
Vardan Ajemian (1905–1977), Armenian Soviet theatre director and actor

Achemian
Mkrtich Achemian (1838–1917), Armenian poet

Adjemian
Martín Adjemián (1932–2006), Argentine actor
Vartan Adjemian or Vardan Adjemyan (born 1956), Armenian composer

Acemoğlu 
(Turkified version of this surname due to Turkish nationalist policies)
Daron Acemoglu (born 1967), American economist

Armenian-language surnames